The National Museum of Natural History at the National Academy of Sciences of Ukraine is a natural history museum in the Ukrainian capital Kyiv. It is one of the largest scientific research museums of its type.

History of the museum
The museum is housed in a former Olgynska School, built in 1914–1927 in the neoclassical style. It was granted the status of the National Museum on December 10, 1996, according to the decision of the President of Ukraine.

Structure of displays
The museum was established in 1966 as a unified complex comprising five museum sections: Geological, Paleontological, Zoological, Botanical, and Archaeological. There are approximately 30,000 exhibits in 24 halls with a total area of 8,000 m². The museum is open from Wednesday to Sunday from 10 am to 5 pm.

Proceedings
The museum publishes two annual journals:

 Proceedings of the National Museum of Natural History  (Print) 
 Editor-in-chief: Igor Yemelyanov
 Proceedings of the Theriological School  (Print);  (Online)
 Editor-in-chief: Igor Zagorodniuk

See also
 National Academy of Sciences of Ukraine

References

External links
 
 

1966 establishments in Ukraine
Museums established in 1966
Buildings and structures completed in 1927
Museums in Kyiv
Natural history museums in Ukraine
National Academy of Sciences of Ukraine
Neoclassical architecture in Kyiv
National Academy of Sciences of Ukraine
Institutions with the title of National in Ukraine